Inverness is an unincorporated community and census-designated place (CDP) in western Marin County, California, United States. In the 2020 census, the population was 1,379. The community was named by a Scottish landowner after Inverness in Scotland.

Community 
Inverness is located on the west shore of Tomales Bay, which runs southeast along the line of the San Andreas Fault.  Surrounded by Point Reyes National Seashore, it is primarily a residential community, with little industry other than tourism. It has a small downtown area with a general store, post office, library, two restaurants, one gift shop and a coffee shop. A third restaurant is located a short way north of downtown. There are also a number of hotels and inns spread throughout the town.

One aspect of the town is a concentration of recreational (and some commercial) boating. There is a small public marina, a few private piers, and the Inverness Yacht Club.

Portions of the John Carpenter film The Fog as well as most of his film Village of the Damned were shot in and around Inverness.

History

Although Drake's official log was lost, the ship's doctor's log described landing in an area that reminded him of the White Cliffs of Dover. Drakes Bay is backed by similar-looking cliffs, leading many to believe this is where the ship landed.

The region became the property of James Shafter, who began to develop the property in the 1890s.  It became a summer resort where people from San Francisco and Oakland came to camp, hike and swim in Tomales Bay. Many built small summer cabins that still exist today. Small steamboats took day trippers down the bay to secluded beaches. They left from Brock Schreiber's boathouse, which has been preserved and is a prominent local landmark with its prominent sign "Launch for Hire".

The first post office opened in 1897.

In 1995, Inverness Ridge was the site of the Mt. Vision Fire, which burned a large area of Point Reyes National Seashore and a number of homes built on the ridge. The town itself was threatened but was saved by helicopters dipping water from Tomales Bay to drop on the Bishop pine forest between the town and the burning ridgetop.

Geography 

The CDP includes the secondary community of Inverness Park, southeast of Inverness proper. It is bordered to the east by Point Reyes Station.

It provides services to visitors to the Point Reyes National Seashore and Tomales Bay State Park.

Climate
Inverness has a Mediterranean climate heavily influenced by the nearby Pacific Ocean, with cool, rainy winters and mild, dry summers. The community experiences a fairly narrow range of temperatures, due to its position only a few miles inland. The warmest month is actually September, a common pattern in the Bay Area due to the annual rollover in ocean currents.

Demographics
At the 2010 census Inverness had a population of 1,304. The racial makeup of Inverness was 1,212 (92.9%) White, 15 (1.2%) African American, 8 (0.6%) Native American, 16 (1.2%) Asian, 2 (0.2%) Pacific Islander, 19 (1.5%) from other races, and 32 (2.5%) from two or more races. Hispanic or Latino of any race were 79 people (6.1%).

The census reported that 100% of the population lived in households.

There were 697 households, 90 (12.9%) had children under the age of 18 living in them, 300 (43.0%) were opposite-sex married couples living together, 33 (4.7%) had a female householder with no husband present, 14 (2.0%) had a male householder with no wife present.  There were 48 (6.9%) unmarried opposite-sex partnerships, and 9 (1.3%) same-sex married couples or partnerships. 278 households (39.9%) were one person and 109 (15.6%) had someone living alone who was 65 or older. The average household size was 1.87.  There were 347 families (49.8% of households); the average family size was 2.46.

The age distribution was 139 people (10.7%) under the age of 18, 35 people (2.7%) aged 18 to 24, 226 people (17.3%) aged 25 to 44, 553 people (42.4%) aged 45 to 64, and 351 people (26.9%) who were 65 or older. The median age was 57.3 years. For every 100 females, there were 82.9 males. For every 100 females age 18 and over, there were 82.0 males.

There were 1,130 housing units at an average density of 165.3 per square mile, of the occupied units 451 (64.7%) were owner-occupied and 246 (35.3%) were rented. The homeowner vacancy rate was 2.2%; the rental vacancy rate was 9.8%. 65.7% of the population lived in owner-occupied housing units and 34.3% lived in rental housing units.

References

External links

Inverness Library
 Inverness info at pointreyes.org

Populated coastal places in California
Census-designated places in Marin County, California
West Marin
Census-designated places in California